Regina East was a provincial electoral district in the Canadian Province of Saskatchewan.  It was created prior to the election of 1964, when the four member Regina City constituency was broken up into two constituencies with two members each, Regina West and Regina East. Regina East was dissolved prior to the election of 1967, when multi-member constituencies were abolished.

Saskatchewan general election, 1964 

 Elected.
X Incumbent.

References 

Former provincial electoral districts of Saskatchewan